Yogi Bear's Jellystone Park Camp-Resorts are a chain of over 80 family campgrounds throughout the United States and Canada. The camp-resorts are franchised through Leisure Systems, Inc. (LSI), a wholly owned subsidiary of The Park River Corporation, based out of Cincinnati, Ohio. The current President of Leisure Systems, Inc. is Robert (Rob) Schutter, Jr.

About the Parks

History 
Yogi Bear's Jellystone Park Camp-Resorts were founded in 1969 by Doug Haag & Robert Borkovetz. The first Jellystone Park was built in Sturgeon Bay, Wisconsin, and still remains a part of the franchise today.  The idea to start a campground came to Haag during a drive down the local highway. As he passed cars and campers on the highway, he got the idea to give families a destination where they could camp and vacation for the summer. 
Haag and his business partner purchased 30 acres of land in Wisconsin which would be the site of the first Jellystone Park Camp-Resort. The inspiration for the name "Jellystone Park" came as Haag overheard his children watching Yogi Bear cartoons.  He set up a meeting with the Vice President of Screen Gems (then licensor of the Yogi Bear and Jellystone Park names as the syndicator of the content of Yogi's studio, Hanna-Barbera) and got approval to associate the names with his campground. 
Ground broke on the campground in April 1969 and three months later, the campground officially opened for business. The original price to camp at a Jellystone Park was $3.50.

Franchise Data 
There are currently 79 licensed campgrounds located in 30 states and three provinces.  Each campground is themed with Yogi Bear elements to provide instant recognition and appeal. 
An estimated 2 million campers stay at a Jellystone Park Camp-Resort each year.
The Yogi Bear characters (including Yogi, Ranger Smith, Boo-Boo, and Cindy) that often appear at the campgrounds are licensed through Hanna-Barbera Productions, a subsidiary of Warner Bros. Discovery.

Jellystone Standards 
A prospective campground must meet certain standards before becoming a Jellystone Park. They are required to have specific amenities including a swimming pool, a game room, children's playground, video theater and a 20' x 40' covered pavilion. A majority of the resorts also offer snack bars, miniature golf courses, and water parks. All the parks are themed with Yogi Bear elements and must promote the theme throughout the park.

Gallery

See also
 Yogi Bear
 Hanna-Barbera Land

References

Sources and External Links
 http://www.campjellystone.com/
 http://www.jellystonefranchise.com
 2011 Yogi Bear's Jellystone Park Camp Resorts Directory Pamphlet
 2009 Yogi Bear's Jellystone Park Camp Resorts Directory Booklet

Campgrounds in the United States
Campsites in Canada
Yogi Bear